2-(Ethylamino)-1,2-diphenylethanone (also known as α-ethylamino-deoxybenzoin, [α-(Ethylamino)benzyl]-(phenyl)-ketone and βk-Ephenidine) is a chemical compound which was first invented in 1955, researched by ICI in 1969 as an antidepressant, and subsequently claimed by AstraZeneca as an inhibitor of the enzyme 11β-Hydroxysteroid dehydrogenase type 1. No other pharmacological data has been disclosed, though its chemical structure closely resembles that of certain designer drug compounds such as ephenidine and N-ethylhexedrone.

See also
 α-PCYP
 Fluorolintane
 Indapyrophenidone
 Lefetamine
 UWA-001

References 

Enzyme inhibitors
AstraZeneca brands